A provitamin is a substance that may be converted within the body to a vitamin. The term previtamin is a synonym.

The term "provitamin" is used when it is desirable to label a substance with little or no vitamin activity, but which can be converted to an active form by normal metabolic processes. Some provitamins are:
 "Provitamin A" is a name for β-carotene, which has only about 1/6 the biological activity of retinol (vitamin A); the body uses an enzyme to convert β-carotene to retinol. In other contexts, both β-carotene and retinol are simply considered to be different forms (vitamers) of vitamin A.
 "Provitamin B5" is a name for panthenol, which may be converted in the body to vitamin B5 (pantothenic acid).
 Menadione is a synthetic provitamin of vitamin K.
 Provitamin D2 is ergosterol, and provitamin D3 is 7-dehydrocholesterol. They are converted by UV light into vitamin D. The human body produces provitamin D3 naturally; deficiency is usually caused by a lack of sun exposure, not a lack of the provitamin.

References 

Vitamins